Harcourt North is a rural locality in the City of Greater Bendigo and Mount Alexander Shire in the Australian state of Victoria.

References 

Towns in Victoria (Australia)
Bendigo
Suburbs of Bendigo